The sheaf toss is a traditional Scottish agricultural sport event originally contested at country fairs. A pitchfork is used to hurl a burlap bag stuffed with straw over a horizontal bar above the competitor's head. Typical weight for the bag is 16 pounds (about 7 kg). Three chances are given to each competitor to cleanly go over the bar. After all challengers have made their attempts, the bar is raised and all successful competitors move on to the new height. This continues until all but one athlete is eliminated.

The Sheaf toss has been incorporated as an event at many of the Scottish highland games although technically it is not itself a heavy athletics event. The sheaf toss is also a traditional sport in the Basque Country. It is a feature of the annual Sykehouse Show in South Yorkshire, England.

Sheaf tossing is also contested in Ireland and Australia particularly at agricultural shows and at fairs; Irish sheaf tossing differs from sheaf tossing in Scotland and France in that the sheaf is made of rushes which are bound tightly with baling twine and are not placed in a bag. The rules are the same as the Scottish version and a pitchfork is used. The same pitchfork is usually used for all competitors so as not to give anybody an unfair advantage by allowing them use their own customised pitchfork. A variation of this rule is that if one brings a custom pitchfork to the competition, they must allow any other competitor to use that fork.

See also
 Basque hay bale tossing
 Sport in Scotland

References

Highland games
Individual sports
Throwing sports
Sports originating in Scotland
Strength sports